John White  (born 5 April 1936, in Berlin) is an English experimental composer and musical performer. He invented the early British form of minimalism known as systems music, with his early Machines.

Life and career
White was born in Berlin to an English father and German mother. The family moved to London at the outbreak of war. Originally a sculptor, White decided on a composition career when he heard Messiaen's Turangalîla-Symphonie.
He studied composition at the London Royal College of Music from 1955 to 1958 with Bernard Stevens and piano with Arthur Alexander and Eric Harrison. He also took analysis classes privately with Elisabeth Lutyens. Upon graduation, White became the musical director of the Western Theatre Ballet, and then professor of composition at the Royal College of Music from 1961 to 1967. He is a skilled pianist and tuba player and has written extensively for both instruments.

In the 1960s and 1970s he was closely associated with English experimental composers such as Cornelius Cardew and Gavin Bryars. His Royal College of Music pupils have included Roger Smalley, Brian Dennis and William York. White's association with younger composers, including Christopher Hobbs, Dave Smith, Benedict Mason, and John Lely has led to many British ensembles, including the Promenade Theatre Orchestra, Hobbs-White Duo, Garden Furniture Music, the  Farewell Symphony Orchestra and other groups.

John White is also the long–standing  Head of Music at Drama Centre London.

Works
White's style is informed by what Dave Smith called an 'apparently disparate collection of composers from the world of "alternative" musical history', including Satie, Alkan, Schumann, Reger, Szymanowski, Busoni and Medtner. These composers have influenced his piano sonatas, which White has been writing since 1956, but other influences on his wider work include Messiaen, Rachmaninoff, and the electronic pop ensembles Kraftwerk, and The Residents. Although it is so eclectic as to cover a wide range of styles, White's work has been called ironic, 'experimental', and even 'avant postmodern'. Although White had worked in what could be called an 'experimental' style since 1962, he composed music using indeterminate means after 1966. His work today includes music having numerical or other systems processes.

As of 2019, White has written 180 piano sonatas, 25 symphonies, 30 ballets, and much incidental music for the stage, all in a highly eclectic style (or, more accurately, range of styles). His stage music includes commissions by the Royal Shakespeare Company and the Royal National Theatre. Other projects include a set of song cycles, one of which consists of settings of friends' addresses.

See also
 Promenade Theatre Orchestra
 Systems music

References

External links
 , played by Jonathan Powell at the 'Indian Summer in Levoca' festival, 2008.
 Convivium Records. John White: Adventures at the Keyboard
 Experimental Music: John White performs his sonatas

Sources
Anderson, Virginia. 1991. 'White, John'. In Contemporary Composers. London: St. James Press.
Anderson, Virginia. 1983. "British Experimental Music: Cornelius Cardew and his Contemporaries".  M.A. thesis, Redlands, California: University of Redlands (Facsimile edition published 2000, Leicester: Experimental Music Catalogue; new edition forthcoming, as Experimental Music in Britain.)
Smith, Dave, “Albus Liber: Exploits and Opinions of John White, Composer Volume I” (Journal of the London Institute of 'Pataphysics), Atlas Press, 2014. 

1936 births
Living people
Alumni of the Royal College of Music
Academics of the Royal College of Music
English classical pianists
Male classical pianists
English classical tubists
English classical composers
English opera composers
Male opera composers
English experimental musicians
English male classical composers
British male pianists
21st-century classical pianists
21st-century tubists
21st-century British male musicians